"The Wizard" is the 171st episode of the NBC sitcom Seinfeld. This was the 15th episode for the ninth and final season. It aired on February 26, 1998. In this episode, Kramer retires and moves into the same condo as Morty and Helen Seinfeld, Elaine tries to find out if her pale-skinned boyfriend is actually black, and George gets upset that the Rosses won't call him a liar after they catch him lying about buying a house in the Hamptons.

Plot
Jerry goes to Del Boca Vista and gives his dad Morty a $200 Wizard organizer for a birthday present, claiming he got it for $50. Jerry becomes frustrated that Morty only uses it as a tip calculator, disregarding its other functions.

Susan Ross's parents inform George that the Susan Ross Foundation is having an event. George makes the excuse that he has to close on buying a house in the Hamptons. The Rosses ask Elaine about George's house. She laughingly says he does not have one, but when George tells them more about his house, they do not call him out for lying. Elaine informs George that the Rosses knew he was lying. Outraged, he invites the Rosses to his house in the Hamptons, to impel them to say he is lying. George drives the Rosses all the way to the tip of Long Island, but they continue to play along with the lie. George finally caves and asks why they did not stop him; the Rosses reveal they were being vindictive, because they blame George for Susan's death.

Kramer retires and moves to Del Boca Vista after a Hollywood studio purchases the movie rights to his coffee table book about coffee tables. An election is held for president of the condo association. Morty cannot run because he was impeached from The Pines of Mar Gables in "The Cadillac", so he persuades Kramer to run and let him dictate things from behind the scenes, like a puppet regime. The campaign is threatened when Kramer is caught barefoot in the clubhouse, a scandalous violation of rules (he says he was unable to find his shoes). Kramer suggests buying each of the 20 members of the condo board a Wizard organizer; Bob Sacamano's father can get them cheap. However, the cheap organizers are Willards, a knockoff brand of poor quality. Outrage over the faulty organizers costs Kramer the election, and he moves back to New York. Jerry confesses to his father that the Wizard was expensive and once again becomes annoyed that he ignores the organizer's other functions.

Jerry tells Elaine that her pale-skinned, blue-eyed new boyfriend, Darryl, is black. Elaine wants to know his race but feels it would be offensive to ask or assume, so she takes him out to Spanish restaurants as a neutral option while she tries to figure out his race. Darryl says they are an interracial couple. However, when Elaine boasts to a waitress that her boyfriend is black, he denies it. He says he referred to them as an interracial couple because he thought she was Hispanic, due to her surname and always going to Spanish restaurants. They glumly realize they are "just a couple of white people" and agree to conclude their date by going to The Gap.

Production
The Seinfeld writers had always planned an episode dealing with race. An initial idea had Elaine getting lost in Harlem, but the idea was abandoned when "they simply could not get the tone right." Sequences which were filmed for the episode but deleted before broadcast include Jerry meeting with Bob Sacamano's father and George explaining why he has not been at the Susan Ross Foundation since the season 8 episode "The Van Buren Boys": the foundation had spent all its assets.

George's line "Alright, you want to get nuts? Come on, let's get nuts!" was taken from the 1989 film Batman.

Analysis
"The Wizard" satirises the discomfort of white Americans when discussing issues of race. Tim Delaney, in Seinology: The Sociology of Seinfeld, wrote that the episode "does a wonderful job of illustrating the delicate nature of discussing race, even when it's between friends, who assumingly, are not racist." Albert Auster, of Fordham University, wrote: "If the series did have one strong point in its dealings with race, it was with the embarrassment and uneasiness that middle-class whites often feel about the issue." Paul Arras, in his book Seinfeld: A Cultural History, described "The Wizard" as "a tongue-in-cheek acknowledgement of the show's lack of black characters, revealing how the pursuit of diversity can be disingenuous."

References

External links

Seinfeld (season 9) episodes
1998 American television episodes